The Sardar-e-Jung was the second highest military decoration  by the awarded by the Azad Hind Government. First instituted by Subhas Chandra Bose in Germany, it was later also awarded to troops of the Indian National Army in South East Asia. The award could be conferred with swords for valour in combat, and without swords for non-combat awards. At least three awards were made, one to Colonel Shaukat Ali Malik for the capture of Moirang, to Capt Shangara Singh Mann and to Lt  Kunwar Balwant singh for capturing British Army Post at Modak. Capt. Mann was also awarded the Vir-e-Hind medal. Colonel Pritam Singh was awarded Sardar-e-jung, he captured a hill named Pritam Hill in Myanmar, Burma & Palel Airport.

See also
Sher-e-Hind
Indian National Army
Indische Legion

External links
 https://www.thirdreichmedals.com/azad-hind.html
http://www.diggerhistory.info/pages-medals/nazi6.htm

www.thirdreichmedals.com/azad-hind.html

Military awards and decorations of Azad Hind